Carlos Pesantes Carbajal (born 28 September 1951) is a Peruvian chess FIDE master (FM) (1989), Peruvian Chess Championship winner (1974).

Biography
Carlos Pesantes Carbajal is from Trujillo. He won the Peruvian Chess Championship in 1974. In 1977 in Santa Cruz de la Sierra Carlos Pesantes Carbajal participated in the 9th Pan-American Chess Championship and ranked in 10th place.

Carlos Pesantes Carbajal played for Peru in the Chess Olympiads:
 In 1972, at fourth board in the 20th Chess Olympiad in Skopje (+5, =5, −7),
 In 1992, at second reserve board in the 30th Chess Olympiad in Manila (+1, =1, −3).

References

External links

1951 births
Living people
Peruvian chess players
Chess FIDE Masters
Chess Olympiad competitors
20th-century Peruvian people
21st-century Peruvian people